Arthur Gregory (7 July 1861 – 17 August 1929) was an Australian cricketer. He played six first-class matches for New South Wales between 1880/81 and 1888/89.

See also
 List of New South Wales representative cricketers

References

External links
 

1861 births
1929 deaths
Australian cricketers
New South Wales cricketers
Cricketers from Sydney